Milena is a 1991 French biographical film about Czech writer Milena Jesenská.

Cast 
 Valérie Kaprisky - Milena Jesenska
 Stacy Keach - Jesenski
 Gudrun Landgrebe - Olga
 Nick Mancuso - Jaromir
 Peter Gallagher - Pollak
 Yves Jacques - Max Brod
 Jacques Penot - Simon Foreman
 Jeanne Marine - Lisa
 Philip Anglim - Kafka

External links 

French biographical films
1990s biographical films
English-language French films
1990s English-language films
1990s French films